Isabella Nichols is an Australian professional surfer who competes at the World Surf League.

Early life 
She is from Coolum Beach, Queensland. She has been surfing since she was nine years old. She won the world junior championship in January 2016 held in Portugal.

Career 
She was the stunt double for Blake Lively in the movie The Shallows (film). She is currently ranked 20th in Women's QS series. She is currently studying a Bachelor of Mechanical Engineering - Honours at Deakin University. She won the final of the 2022 women's Margaret River Pro on the WSL tour held in 6' surf at Margaret River Main Break defeating Gabriela Bryan of Kauai, Hawaii. Final score in the Final was 12.94 to 10.00 out of a possible 20.00.  The win catapulted Nichols to 4th place on the WSL tour rankings.

References

External links

Sportswomen from Queensland
Australian female surfers
World Surf League surfers
Australian stunt performers
Women stunt performers
Year of birth missing (living people)
Living people
People from the Sunshine Coast, Queensland